Wellesley K. Clayton (born 25 August 1938) is a Jamaican former long jumper who competed in the 1964 Summer Olympics and in the 1968 Summer Olympics.

He established himself among the Caribbean's best jumpers at the Central American and Caribbean Games, taking the silver medal in 1962, then the gold medal in 1966 – Jamaica's second ever games winner in that event, after Deryck Taylor. In 1966 he was also in Jamaica's gold medal-winning 4×100 metres relay team. He enjoyed a variety of successes at the British West Indies Championships: after a long jump bronze in 1959 and a pentathlon silver in 1960, he won two straight long jump titles in 1964 to 1965, as well as the 1964 110 metres hurdles title.

He was twice a bronze medallist in the long jump at the British Empire and Commonwealth Games, 1962 and again in 1966. He followed this with another bronze medal at the 1967 Pan American Games.

References

1938 births
Living people
Jamaican male long jumpers
Jamaican male sprinters
Olympic athletes of Jamaica
Athletes (track and field) at the 1964 Summer Olympics
Athletes (track and field) at the 1968 Summer Olympics
Commonwealth Games bronze medallists for Jamaica
Commonwealth Games medallists in athletics
Athletes (track and field) at the 1962 British Empire and Commonwealth Games
Athletes (track and field) at the 1966 British Empire and Commonwealth Games
Pan American Games medalists in athletics (track and field)
Athletes (track and field) at the 1967 Pan American Games
Pan American Games bronze medalists for Jamaica
Competitors at the 1962 Central American and Caribbean Games
Competitors at the 1966 Central American and Caribbean Games
Central American and Caribbean Games gold medalists for Jamaica
Central American and Caribbean Games silver medalists for Jamaica
Central American and Caribbean Games medalists in athletics
Medalists at the 1967 Pan American Games
20th-century Jamaican people
21st-century Jamaican people
Medallists at the 1962 British Empire and Commonwealth Games
Medallists at the 1966 British Empire and Commonwealth Games